Yves Barsacq (17 June 1931 – 4 October 2015) was a French film actor, who appeared in more than 150 films. He is the son of the French-Russian production designer Léon Barsacq and the nephew of the French theatre director André Barsacq.

Selected filmography

 Amour de poche (1957)
 Charming Boys (1957)
 Line of Sight (1960)
 Sergeant X (1960)
 All the Gold in the World  (1961)
 The Law of Men (1962)
 Pouic-Pouic (1963)
 Angélique, Marquise des Anges (1964)
 Play Time (1967)
 Le Gendarme se marie (1968)
 Le Gendarme en balade (1970)
 Elise, or Real Life (1970)
 Le Chat (1971)
 Hit! (1973)
 Love and Death (1975)
 F comme Fairbanks (1976)
 The Passengers (1977)
 Julien Fontanes, magistrat (1981)
 Princes et princesses (2000)

References

External links

1931 births
2015 deaths
French male film actors
Male actors from Paris
20th-century French male actors
French people of Russian descent